"Monsters" is a song by American rock band Shinedown. It was their third single from their sixth studio album Attention Attention. It reached the top of the Billboard Mainstream Rock Songs chart in June 2019. Upon reaching number one on the Mainstream Rock, Shinedown moved into second place for the most Mainstream Rock number ones with fourteen songs. "Monsters" was nominated for iHeartRadio's rock song of the year award.

Background
The song was released in March 2019, as the third single from the band's studio album Attention Attention, after "Devil" and "Get Up". In April 2019, Billboard noted that the song had become the band's twenty fifth top-ten song on the Mainstream Rock Songs chart. As of June 2019, it had reached number two on the chart, and it topped it for a week in July. The band teased a music video for the song as early as July 2018, though one wasn't released until June 2019. On July 2, 2019, the band released an animated video for the song.

Themes and composition
Attention Attention is a concept album, that, from beginning to end of the album, "charts the life of an individual protagonist from excruciating lows to searing highs”, with the track appearing at the mid-point of the album. Smith states that the song was influenced by his past struggles with alcoholism and substance abuse that he struggled with around The Sound of Madness era of the band, stating:  Smith similarly noted the song was influenced by his self-awareness of the issue, and his belief that despite his control of his sobriety, he feels that just one drink of alcohol could lead him straight back into binge drinking and causing trouble.

While critics saw much of the Attention Attention as an attempt to cater to the fans of modern pop bands like Imagine Dragons, "Monsters" was noted as sounding like more of the classic Shinedown sound.

Personnel
Band

 Brent Smith – vocals
 Zach Myers – guitar
 Eric Bass – bass
 Barry Kerch – drums

Charts
In June 2019, "Monsters" peaked at number one on the Billboard Mainstream Rock. The song gave Shinedown their fourteenth number one and moved the band to second for the most Mainstream Rock number ones.

Weekly charts

Year-end charts

Certifications

References

2018 singles
2018 songs
Shinedown songs
Songs about alcohol
Songs written by Brent Smith
Songs written by Eric Bass